20 Greatest Hits is an album by The Dubliners, re-released on 7 January 2013. The album charted at No.100 in the Irish Album Charts.

Track listing

"Free the People" – 3:14
"Biddy Mulligan" – 2:00
"Scorn Not His Simplicity" – 3:38
"Donegal Danny" – 5:41
"Joe Hill" – 2:48
"The Captains & the Kings" – 3:34
"My Darling Asleep / Paddy in London / An t-Athair Jack Walsh" – 2:58
"Molly Malone" – 2:58
"Song for Ireland " – 4:42
"Dicey Rielly" – 2:41
"The Rare Old Times" – 5:30
"Finnegan's Wake" – 2:30
"The Marino Waltz" – 2:40
"The Auld Triangle" – 2:55
"I'll Tell Me Ma" – 2:31
"The Town I Loved So Well" – 6:22
"Cooley’s Reel / The Dawn / The Mullingar Races" – 3:26
"The Night Visiting Song" – 3:28
"Seven Drunken Nights" – 3:14
"The Irish Rover" – 4:06

References

2013 greatest hits albums
The Dubliners compilation albums